Bethune Beach is an unincorporated community in Volusia County, Florida, United States. It is an urban residential single-family zoned community known for its peace, quiet and quaintness.

Bethune Beach is located south of New Smyrna Beach (with Silver Sands between), and its southern border is the northern end of the Canaveral National Seashore. Due to its remote location, Bethune Beach is accessible by only one road, County Road A1A, entry being permitted only from the north. There is no outlet to the mainland, and the Canaveral National Seashore and the Kennedy Space Center lie to the south.

History
The town had the only beach that African Americans were permitted to use in Volusia County during the first half of the twentieth century and is named after educator Dr. Mary McLeod Bethune, founder of Bethune-Cookman College. In 2007, Bethune Beach residents overwhelmingly voted to reject an annexation attempt by New Smyrna Beach.  This area is best known for its no-drive beach and proximity to Atlantic Ocean and Indian River on either side. 

Unincorporated communities in Volusia County, Florida
Unincorporated communities in Florida
Populated coastal places in Florida on the Atlantic Ocean
Beaches of Volusia County, Florida
Beaches of Florida
African-American resorts